E5, E05 or E-5 may refer to:

 E5 fuel, a mixture of 5% ethanol and 95% gasoline

Transportation

Airlines
 Samara Airlines, a former Russian airline with IATA code E5

Automobiles
 BYD e5, a 2015–2020 Chinese compact electric sedan
 Chery E5, a 2011–2016 Chinese compact sedan
 Weltmeister E5, a 2021–present Chinese compact electric sedan
 Bestune NAT, a 2021–present Chinese compact electric MPV

Roads and routes
 E5 European long distance path, a European long-distance walking route 
 E5 expressway (Philippines) (North Luzon Expressway Segments 8, 9 & 10), an expressway route in the Philippines
 European route E5, a road in the international E-road network
 London Buses route E5, a Transport for London contracted bus route
 Shah Alam Expressway, route E5 in Malaysia
 Hokkaido Jukan expressways (a combination of Hakodate Shindō, Hokkaido Expressway, Nayoro-Bifuka Road, Otoineppu Bypass, Horotomi Bypass and Toyotomi Bypass), route E5 in Japan

Locomotives
 E5 Series Shinkansen, a Japanese high-speed train
 EMD E5, an American diesel locomotive
 LB&SCR E5 class, a British steam locomotive
 LNER Class E5, a class of British steam locomotives

Electronics
 Honda E5, one of the predecessors of ASIMO robot
 Huawei E5, a series of mobile WiFi devices
 Nokia E5, a smartphone
 Olympus E-5, a DSLR camera
 Samsung Galaxy E5, a smartphone

Sports
 Earl Clark (born 1988), forward for the University of Louisville men's basketball team
 E5 grade, of difficulty in rock climbing

Military
 E-5 (rank), a military pay grade in the United States
 E5, a German World War II tank version in the Entwicklung series
 , a 1911 Royal Navy submarine
 Windecker E-5, an American experimental stealth aircraft of the 1970s

Medicine
 E05: Hyperthyroidism, ICD-10 code 
 E5, a codename for edobacomab

Other uses
 E5 (EP), an album by Ivy Queen
 E5 polytope, in geometry
 E5 screw, a type of Edison screw
 E5, a postcode district in the E postcode area